Masudur Rahman (born 13 April 1975) is a Bangladeshi international cricket umpire and former first-class cricketer.

A right-handed batsman and off-break bowler, he made his first-class debut for Dhaka Metropolis in 2000/01 and played for Barisal Division in 2001/02 and Dhaka Division from 2003/04 to 2004/05.  He scored one first-class fifty, a knock of 59 against his former team Dhaka Division and took 4 for 102 against Chittagong Division.

Soon after retiring, Masudur became an umpire.

Umpiring career
He made his List A umpiring debut in November 2007 and his First-class debut in December 2008. He stood in the one-day tour match between Bangladesh Cricket Board Select XI and England XI during England's tour to Bangladesh in October 2016. On 21 January 2018, he stood in his first One Day International (ODI) match in the fixture between Sri Lanka and Zimbabwe in the 2017–18 Bangladesh Tri-Nation Series. On 18 February 2018, he stood in his first Twenty20 International (T20I) match in the fixture between Bangladesh and Sri Lanka. In January 2020, he was named as one of the sixteen umpires for the 2020 Under-19 Cricket World Cup tournament in South Africa. He was one of the two on field umpire for the 2022 Asia Cup final in Dubai on 11 September 2022.

See also
 List of One Day International cricket umpires
 List of Twenty20 International cricket umpires

References

https://masudur.org

External links
 

1975 births
Living people
Bangladeshi cricketers
Bangladeshi cricket umpires
Bangladeshi One Day International cricket umpires
Bangladeshi Twenty20 International cricket umpires
Dhaka Metropolis cricketers
Barisal Division cricketers
Dhaka Division cricketers
People from Faridpur District